Jozef Sombat (born 1 April 1994) is a Slovak football forward who plays for Austrian club SC Kittsee.

Club career

FC ViOn Zlaté Moravce - Vráble
Sombat made his professional Fortuna Liga debut for ViOn Zlaté Moravce against Žilina on 24 September 2016.

References

External links
 Fortuna Liga profile
 
 Eurofotbal profile
 Futbalnet profile
 Jozef Sombat at ÖFB

1994 births
Living people
Sportspeople from Nitra
Slovak footballers
Slovak expatriate footballers
Association football forwards
FC ViOn Zlaté Moravce players
MFK Lokomotíva Zvolen players
MFK Skalica players
FC Petržalka players
Slovak Super Liga players
2. Liga (Slovakia) players
Austrian 2. Landesliga players
Slovak expatriate sportspeople in Austria
Expatriate footballers in Austria